Đặng Thị Ngọc Hân (born 16 July 1989 in Hanoi, Vietnam) is the winner of the 2010 Miss Vietnam. pageant that takes place in Tuần Châu, Quảng Ninh on August 14, 2010.

Biography
She was born and grew up in Hanoi, Vietnam. Her grandfather is notable teacher Đặng Đình Huân who is well known in Haiphong. She entered the 2010 Miss Vietnam contest and won while studying  department at the Hanoi College of Fine Arts.

She started to model at the age of 16 and had become a familiar face on the runway in Hanoi. She has been awarded: Most photogenic Vietnamese model in 2006, Miss Icon Student 2005, First prize of product program Yomost, Most beautiful female student at Tran nhan Tong High School.

After crowned Miss Vietnam 2010, Ngọc Hân was invited to compete in Miss World 2010 and 2011 but she declined as personal reasons.

References

Living people
Miss Vietnam winners
1989 births
People from Hanoi
Vietnamese female models
21st-century Vietnamese women